Małgorzata Szejnert (born 28 April 1936, Warsaw) is a Polish journalist and writer.

Life and career 
She graduated from the Emilia Plater Girls' High School in Biała Podlaska. She also graduated from the Faculty of Journalism at the University of Warsaw. She was head of the reportage section in the weekly newspaper Literatura. In 1981, after the imposition of martial law in Poland, she collaborated with the underground anti-communist press. In 1984, she moved to the United States where she worked for the Nowy Dziennik daily newspaper. In 1986, she returned to Poland. She is one of the co-founders of Gazeta Wyborcza.

She made her literary debut in 1972, with the publication of Borowiki przy ternpajku, a book about the Polish diaspora in America. In 2008, she was nominated to the Angelus Award for her book Czarny ogród (The Black Garden). Her book Wyspa klucz received a nomination to the Nike Award in 2010. Her another work, Usypać góry. Historie z Polesia, was nominated to the Ryszard Kapuściński Award in 2015.

In 2015, she was awarded the Officer's Cross of the Order of Polonia Restituta.

Bibliography 
Borowiki przy ternpajku, Warsaw: Ludowa Spółdzielnia Wydawnicza, 1972.
Ulica z latarnią, Warsaw: Ludowa Spółdzielnia Wydawnicza, 1977.
I niespokojnie tu i tam, Olsztyn: Wydawnictwo Pojezierze, 1980.
Szczecin: Grudzień-Sierpień-Grudzień, współautor Tomasz Zalewski, Warsaw: NOWA, 1984; London: Aneks, 1986.
Sława i infamia. Rozmowa z Bohdanem Korzeniewskim, London: Aneks,1988; Warszawa: „Pokolenie”, 1988; Kraków: Wydawnictwo Literackie, 1992
Śród żywych duchów, London: Aneks, 1990; wyd. II, Warsaw: Znak, 2012 
Czarny ogród, Kraków: Społeczny Instytut Wydawniczy Znak, 2007, 
Szczecin: Grudzień-Sierpień-Grudzień współautor Tomasz Zalewski, London: Aneks, 1990; 
Szczecin: Walkowska Wydawnictwo, 2008, 
Wyspa klucz, Kraków: Społeczny Instytut Wydawniczy Znak, 2009, 
Dom żółwia. Zanzibar, Kraków: Społeczny Instytut Wydawniczy Znak, 2011, 
My, właściciele Teksasu. Reportaże z PRL-u, Kraków: Społeczny Instytut Wydawniczy Znak, 2013, .
Usypać góry. Historie z Polesia, Kraków: Społeczny Instytut Wydawniczy Znak, 2015,

See also
Polish literature
List of Polish writers
Nike Award

External links 
 www.culture.pl – Małgorzata Szejnert

References

1936 births
Living people
Polish journalists
Polish women journalists
University of Warsaw alumni
People from Warsaw
20th-century Polish non-fiction writers
21st-century Polish non-fiction writers
20th-century Polish women writers
21st-century Polish women writers